The Men's 400 metres at the 2014 Commonwealth Games, as part of the athletics programme, was held at Hampden Park between 28 and 30 July 2014. The event was won by pre-event favourite and Olympic champion Kirani James in a new Commonwealth Games record. Wayde van Niekerk from South Africa came second and Lalonde Gordon of Trinidad and Tobago got the bronze medal.

Results

First round

Heat 1

Heat 2

Heat 3

Heat 4

Heat 5

Heat 6

Heat 7

Semi-finals

Semi-final 1

Semi-final 2

Semi-final 3

Final

References

Men's 400 metres
2014